Kaye may refer to:
Kaye (given name)
Kaye (surname)
Kayes, city in Mali, sometimes also spelled Kaye.
the ICAO code for Moore Army Airfield
KAYE-FM, a radio station (90.7 FM) licensed to Tonkawa, Oklahoma, United States
Charlene Kaye, American singer who has recorded under the name "KAYE"

See also
Kaye effect, a physical property of complex liquids